Lew Nichols III (born August 16, 2001) is an American football running back for the Central Michigan Chippewas. During the 2021 regular season, he led the NCAA Division I Football Bowl Subdivision with 1,710 rushing yards.

Early years
Nichols attended Cass Technical High School in Detroit. He played football under Cass Tech head coach Thomas Wilcher. As a senior in 2018, Nichols rushed for 1,078 yards and 23 touchdowns on 84 carries. He was named to all-state teams selected by the Detroit Free Press, The Detroit News, and the Associated Press.

Central Michigan
During the 2019 season, Nichols appeared in four games for Central Michigan, carrying 19 times for 89 yards.  As a redshirt freshman during the COVID 19-shortened 2020 season, Nichols rushed for 196 yards and two fourth-quarter touchdowns in a 31–23 victory over rival Eastern Michigan. For the season, he rushed for 508 yards on 78 carries, an average of 6.5 yards per carry. He won the MAC freshman of the year award.

Due to special eligibility rules enacted for the 2020 season, Nichols repeated as a redshirt freshman in 2021. He led all players in NCAA Division I Football Bowl Subdivision (FBS) with 1,710 rushing yards during the 2021 regular season. He also led the nation with 311 carries. His He had nine 100-yard rushing games in 2021, including totals of 219 yards against Ball State, 215 yards against Kent State, 194 yards against Eastern Michigan, 192 yards against Northern Illinois, and 186 yards against Ohio.  His 1,710 yards was the second highest single-season total in Central Michigan history (behind Brian Pruitt's 1,890 yards in 1994).

After the 2021 season ended, Nichols was named the Mid-American Conference Offensive Player of the Year. Despite leading the nation in rushing, Nichols was not selected as a semifinalist for the Doak Walker Award.

References

External links
 Central Michigan bio

2001 births
Living people
Players of American football from Detroit
American football running backs
Central Michigan Chippewas football players